Space Brothers may refer to:

 The Space Brothers, British trance music act 
 Space Brothers (manga),  a Japanese manga series by Chūya Koyama about two brothers wanting to go into space, which has been adapted into a live action film and anime series
 Nordic aliens, sometimes referred to as 'space brothers'